Reginald Antonio Austin is a former professional American football player who played cornerback for 3 seasons for the Chicago Bears. He was a fourth round selection (125th overall pick) in the 2000 NFL Draft out of Wake Forest University. He played mostly as a backup.

Career
In 2002, Austin's first game was in a September 22 game against the New Orleans Saints.

References 

1977 births
Living people
Players of American football from Atlanta
American football cornerbacks
Wake Forest Demon Deacons football players
Chicago Bears players